Adam Shoalts is a Canadian writer. His books focus on exploring nature.

The CBC placed his most recent book, Beyond the Trees: A Journey Alone Across Canada's Arctic, on their recommended reading list for the winter of 2020.  The book chronicles a  wilderness canoe trip he took to celebrate Canada's sesquicentennial. This was featured in the documentary film Alone Across the Arctic, a companion piece to the book Beyond the Trees.

Publications

References

Shoalts, Adam
21st-century Canadian non-fiction writers
21st-century Canadian male writers
Year of birth missing (living people)
Living people